Carter Crest is a triangle-shaped residential neighbourhood in south west Edmonton, Alberta, Canada.  It is bounded on the north west by Terwillegar Drive, on the north east by Rabbit Hill Road, and on the south by a utility corridor located just north of 29 Avenue.

According to the 2001 federal census, all residential development in the neighbourhood occurred after 1990.

The most common type of residence, according to the 2005 municipal census, is the single-family dwelling.  These account for roughly seven out of every ten (71%) of all the residences in the neighbourhood.  Another one in six (16%) are row houses and one in eight (13%) are duplexes.  Substantially all (97%) residences in the neighbourhood are owner-occupied.

Demographics 

Surrounding neighbourhoods 

Rhatigan Ridge is located just off the north point of the neighbourhood while Bulyea Heights and Ogilvie Ridge share a short boundary with the neighbourhood along Rabbit Hill Road.

References

External links 

Neighbourhoods in Edmonton